Dichaetophora can refer to:

Dichaetophora (plant), a genus of the daisy family
Dichaetophora (fly), a genus of the family Drosophilidae